Fairmount Apartments may refer to:

 Fairmount Apartments (Wichita, Kansas), listed on the NRHP in Kansas
 Fairmount Apartments (Jersey City, New Jersey), listed on the NRHP in New Jersey